Reddington is an unincorporated community in Redding Township, Jackson County, Indiana.

History
Reddington was laid out in 1837. It took its name from Redding Township. A post office was established at Reddington in 1837, and remained in operation until it was discontinued in 1902.

Geography

References

Unincorporated communities in Jackson County, Indiana
Unincorporated communities in Indiana
1837 establishments in Indiana